Butler W. Lampson, ForMemRS, (born December 23, 1943) is an American computer scientist best known for his contributions to the development and implementation of distributed personal computing.

Education and early life
After graduating from the Lawrenceville School (where in 2009 he was awarded the Aldo Leopold Award, also known as the Lawrenceville Medal, Lawrenceville's highest award to alumni), Lampson received an A.B. in physics (magna cum laude with highest honors in the discipline) from Harvard University in 1964 and a PhD in electrical engineering and computer science from the University of California, Berkeley in 1967.

Career and research

During the 1960s, Lampson and others were part of Project GENIE at UC Berkeley. In 1965, several Project GENIE members, specifically Lampson and Peter Deutsch, developed the Berkeley Timesharing System for Scientific Data Systems' SDS 940 computer. After completing his doctorate, Lampson stayed on at UC Berkeley as an assistant professor (1967-1970) and associate professor (1970-1971) of computer science. For a period of time, he concurrently served as director of system development for the Berkeley Computer Corporation (1969-1971).

In 1971, Lampson became one of the founding members of Xerox PARC, where he worked in the Computer Science Laboratory (CSL) as a principal scientist (1971-1975) and senior research fellow (1975-1983). His now-famous vision of a personal computer was captured in the 1972 memo entitled "Why Alto?".  In 1973, the Xerox Alto, with its three-button mouse and full-page-sized monitor, was born.
It is now considered to be the first actual personal computer in terms of what has become the "canonical" GUI mode of operation.

All the subsequent computers built at Xerox PARC except for the "Dolphin" (used in the Xerox 1100 LISP machine) and the "Dorado" (used in the Xerox 1132 LISP machine) followed a general blueprint called "Wildflower", written by Lampson, and this included the D-Series Machines: the "Dandelion" (used in the Xerox Star and Xerox 1108 LISP machine), "Dandetiger" (used in the Xerox 1109 LISP machine), "Daybreak" (Xerox 6085), and "Dicentra" (used internally to control various specialized hardware devices).

At PARC, Lampson helped work on many other revolutionary technologies, such as laser printer design; two-phase commit protocols; Bravo, the first WYSIWYG text formatting program; and Ethernet, the first high-speed local area network (LAN).  He designed several influential programming languages such as Euclid.

Following the acrimonious resignation of Xerox PARC CSL manager Bob Taylor in 1983, Lampson and Chuck Thacker followed their longtime colleague to Digital Equipment Corporation's Systems Research Center. There, he was a senior consulting engineer (1984-1986), corporate consulting engineer (1986-1993) and senior corporate consulting engineer (1993-1995). Shortly before Taylor's retirement, Lampson left to work for Microsoft Research as an architect (1995-1999), distinguished engineer (2000-2005) and technical fellow (2005–present).

Since 1987, Lampson has been an adjunct professor of electrical engineering and computer science at the Massachusetts Institute of Technology.

Honors and awards
 In 1984, he was elected a member of the National Academy of Engineering.
 In 1984, he won the ACM Software System Award for the Alto, along with Robert W. Taylor, and Charles P. Thacker.
 In 1986, he received an honorary Sc.D. from the Eidgenössische Technische Hochschule, Zürich.
 In 1992, he won the prestigious ACM Turing Award for his contributions to personal computing and computer science.
 In 1993, he became a fellow of the American Academy of Arts and Sciences.
 In 1994, he was inducted as a Fellow of the ACM. 
 In 1996, he received the IEEE Computer Pioneer Award.
 In 1996, he received an honorary Sc.D. from the University of Bologna. 
 In 2001, he received the IEEE John von Neumann Medal.
 In 2004, he won the Charles Stark Draper Prize along with Alan C. Kay, Robert W. Taylor, and Charles P. Thacker for their work on Alto. 
 In 2005, he was elected a Member of the National Academy of Sciences. 
 In 2006, he was inducted as a Fellow of the Computer History Museum "for fundamental contributions to computer science, including networked personal workstations, operating systems, computer security and document publishing." Computer History Museum Fellow (2006).
 In 2006, he received the IFIP TC11 Kristian Beckman Award for information security.
 In 2016, he was inducted into the National Cybersecurity Hall of Fame.
 In 2018, he was elected as a Foreign Member of the Royal Society.

Quotes
Lampson is often quoted as saying, "Any problem in computer science can be solved with another level of indirection," but in his Turing Award Lecture in 1993, Lampson himself attributes this saying to David Wheeler.

References

External links

 Lampson's website
 The milliLampson unit
 Butler Lampson. Oral history interview, 11 December 2014, Cambridge, Massachusetts. Charles Babbage Institute, University of Minnesota

1943 births
Living people
American computer scientists
Computer designers
Engineers from Washington, D.C.
Fellows of the Association for Computing Machinery
Members of the United States National Academy of Engineering
Draper Prize winners
Turing Award laureates
Microsoft technical fellows
Digital Equipment Corporation people
Harvard University alumni
UC Berkeley College of Engineering alumni
Lawrenceville School alumni
20th-century American engineers
21st-century American engineers
20th-century American scientists
21st-century American scientists
Scientists at PARC (company)
Foreign Members of the Royal Society
University of California, Berkeley faculty